Half a World Away is the third album by the Geneva-based punk rock band Hateful Monday. It was released on April 15, 2008 on vinyl and CD through GPS Prod and Kicking Records.

Track listing

Personnel 

Hateful Monday
Reverend Seb – lead vocals, bass guitar
Igor Gonzola – drums
Greg Laraigne – guitar, backing vocals
M. Fallan – guitar, backing vocals

Artwork
The front cover was inspired by the work of French artist Gustave Doré.

Production
Serge Morattel – producer, engineer

References 

2008 albums
Hateful Monday albums